Grant Stinnett is an American bassist notable for compositions on the bass guitar played as a solo instrument which use tunings different from the standard bass guitar tuning. For example, he performed using a D-Tuner bass tuned to C G C G for his tune Born of Fire and Light. He played the jazz standard All the things you are using a LeFay Singer six-string bass, with a special tuning from the low E to the high F instead of the usual B to C tuning. Reviewer Jake Kot in Bass Musician Magazine compared Stinnett to bass guitarists such as Michael Manring, Victor Wooten, and Steve Bailey, who play the bass guitar as a solo instrument, and Kot described Stinnett as presenting a "nice array of techno-adventures, ambient excursions, chord/melody playing", with good melodies. Stinnett's album G Money was released in 2006 when he was 17 years old.

References

External links
 Born of Fire and Light, video on YouTube
 ''When She Smiles, YouTube video

Living people
American bass guitarists
American male bass guitarists
Year of birth missing (living people)